William Gordon Antony Wiley (14 November 1931 – 7 December 1999) was a South African first-class cricketer.

Wiley was born at St James in Cape Town. He later travelled to England to study at Lincoln College, Oxford. While at Oxford he made his debut in first-class cricket for Oxford University against Gloucestershire at Oxford in 1952. He made twelve first-class appearances for Oxford in 1952, scoring 580 runs at an average of 27.61, with a high score of 100. This score, which was his only first-class century, came against Sussex at Worthing. During the 1952 season, he also played minor counties cricket for Oxfordshire, making a single appearance against Berkshire in the Minor Counties Championship. Returning to South Africa, Wiley made four first-class appearances for Western Province in the 1952/53 and 1953/54 seasons. He later emigrated to Zimbabwe, where he died at Harare in December 1999. His brother was the cricketer and politician John Wiley.

References

External links

1931 births
1999 deaths
Alumni of Lincoln College, Oxford
South African cricketers
Oxford University cricketers
Oxfordshire cricketers
Western Province cricketers
South African emigrants to Zimbabwe
Cricketers from Cape Town